Eurobank is a financial organisation that operates in Greece, Cyprus, Luxembourg, Serbia, Bulgaria and the UK. As of December 2018, the Eurobank Group counts,  in assets, 653 customer service locations in Greece and abroad, and 13,162 employees.

History
The bank was incorporated in 1924 as “V. Karavasilis Tobacco Company and Bank SA”. In 1937 it was renamed “Karavasilis Bank SA” and in 1952 “Professional Credit Bank SA”. In 1964 it was acquired by the National Bank of Greece, who renamed it Bank of Athens in 1992.

The Euromerchant Bank SA was founded in 1990. It took over 75% of EFG Private Bank (Luxembourg) S.A.'s operations in 1994. In 1997 it was renamed EFG Eurobank SA and acquired Interbank Greece SA and the branch network of Crédit Lyonnais Grèce SA. In February 1999 EFG Eurobank SA merged with Cretabank SA.

In March 1999 Bank of Athens merged with EFG Eurobank SA. In 2000 the bank changed its name to EFG Eurobank Ergasias SA after taking over the renowned Ergasias Bank. In 2002 it acquired Telesis Investment Bank, followed by UnitBank in 2003. A financial products subsidiary was founded in 2007 (49.9% owned by employees).

In 2012, the bank sold 70% of the Polish branches called Polbank to Raiffeisen Bank International.

In 2012, the Spiros Latsis associated Eurobank EFG merger with Giannis Kostopoulos's Alpha Bank was cancelled because of the Greek debt crisis. The proposed merger included a capital boost from Qatar Investment Authority of 500 million euro convertible bond and a 1.25 billion euro rights issue which would have Qatar Investment Authority a major shareholder and from Southeast Europe's biggest bank with assets of 150 billion euros and 80 billion euros of deposits.

After the Greek financial crisis and bailouts of Greek banks in 2012, Swiss-Luxembourg based EFG Group—the then owner of Eurobank—was told to separate the Greek bank from the rest of its business. In July of that year Eurobank was deconsolidated from the group and its shares sold to the Greek Latsis family and it was renamed Eurobank Ergasias.

In January 2013, the National Bank of Greece made an offer, which ultimately did not go through, to take over Eurobank Ergasias; 64,000 Eurobank shareholders and the Greek capital market commission agreed. Later in 2013 Eurobank acquired New TT Hellenic Postbank and New Proton Bank.

The bank was the third largest in Greece by total asset by total loans and total deposits, and the fourth by market capitalisation—as at December 2014.

Since 1 February 2015, the chairman and non-executive director of Eurobank Ergasias has been Nikolaos Karamouzis; Fokion Karavias has been the CEO and executive director since the same day.
Canadian fund Fairfax Financial are major shareholders, with an 18.2% stake in 2018, that was increased after the takeover of Grivalia Properties until 32.9%.

At the end of 2020, the bad loans of the group reached an amount of €5.7 billion. In March 2020, Eurobank announced a project for reducing its nonperforming loans index from 14% to 9%.

Major acquisitions
 In 1998, 78.23% of Bulgarian Postbank was taken over.
In 2000 Acquisition of a 19.25% participation in Bancpost in Romania, which was later increased
In 2002 EFG Eurobank Ergasias – Telesis Investment Bank merger. Acquisition of 50% in Alico / CEH Balkan Holdings leading to a 43% participation in Postbank Bulgaria
In 2003 Merger through absorption of "Ergoinvest S.A.". Merger by absorption of "Investment Development Fund S.A.". Establishment of Euroline Retail Services (Romania) - 80% Eurobank Cards and 19.961% Bancpost. Establishment of Eurocredit Retail Services (Cyprus) as a 100% subsidiary of Eurobank Cards.
In 2004 Establishment of Euroline Retail Services AD (Serbia) - 100% subsidiary of Eurobank Cards
In 2006 Acquisition of 100% of Nacionalna štedionica–banka in Serbia and forming Eurobank a.d.
In 2006 Acquisition of 70% of Tekfenbank, which is a Turkish bank, 99.3% of Universal Bank in Ukraine and 74.3% of Bulgarian Postbank in Bulgaria
On 23 December 2012, Eurobank sells all its shares (70%) of the Tekfenbank to Kuwait's Burgan Bank.
During 2014, Eurobank receives a total of $1.55 billion from several investors including Wilbur Ross (€37.5 million) and the Prem Watsa founded Fairfax Financial Holdings (€400 million).
On 16 January 2015, Eurobank asks Greek Central Bank for Emergency Liquidity Assistance (ELA)
On 17 July 2015 the subsidiary Postbank (Bulgaria) buys the Bulgarian branches of fellow Greek lender Alpha Bank.
In April 2018, its Romanian subsidiary, Bancpost, was sold to Banca Transilvania, the largest Romanian bank.
In November 2018, Eurobank announced the acquisition of the real estate investment company Grivalia Properties, controlled by Fairfax Financial Holdings through its 51% stake. Fairfax increased its stake in Eurobank after the takeover from 18% to 32.9%. In the same month, Eurobank acquired Piraeus Bank's banking subsidiary in Bulgaria (PBB).

Branches

Serbia

Eurobank Direktna (Eurobank Direktna akcionarsko društvo Beograd) is a bank founded in 1997, with headquarters in Belgrade, Serbia. In March 2003, Eurobank acquired 68% of Postbanka AD Beograd and eventually renamed it EFG Eurobank AD Beograd. This was followed by the merger with Nacionalna štedionica Banka. In October 2006, the bank began operating under a single brand, name and visual identity. In 2016, the bank had €1.337 billion in assets and revenue of €18.42 million. In December 2021, the bank merged with Direktna Banka and was renamed to Eurobank Direktna. In March 2023, Serbian AIK Banka bought the majority of shares of the bank, for a total of 280 million euros.

See also

Banking in Greece
List of banks in Greece
List of companies of Greece

References

External links

   Company profile on the website of the Athens Stock Exchange
 Stock quote on Bloomberg

Banks of Greece
Companies listed on the Athens Exchange
Greek brands
Banks under direct supervision of the European Central Bank
Greek companies established in 1990
Banks established in 1990